This page is a timeline of machine learning. Major discoveries, achievements, milestones and other major events are included.

Overview

Timeline

See also
 History of artificial intelligence
 Timeline of artificial intelligence
 Timeline of machine translation

References

Citations

Works cited 

 

Machine learning
Machine learning